Blossom Point, also known as "Cape Blossom", is a headland of Wrangel Island. Administratively it belongs to the Chukotka Autonomous Okrug, Russian Federation. 

There are walruses and polar bears in the area of the cape.

History
This headland marks the northern border between the East Siberian Sea and the Chukchi Sea.

Blossom Point was named in 1881 by USS Rodgers' Lieutenant Robert M. Berry in honor of HMS Blossom, on which the expedition led by Frederick William Beechey surveyed the Chukchi Sea in 1828.  

In 1911, during the Arctic Ocean Hydrographic Expedition led by Boris Vilkitsky on icebreakers Taimyr and Vaigach, the Russian flag was raised north of the cape, towards Cape Thomas, in order to claim Wrangel Island for the Russian Empire.

See also
 List of research stations in the Arctic
 Waring Point

References

Headlands of Chukotka Autonomous Okrug
Wrangel Island
East Siberian Sea
Chukchi Sea